Ronald Joseph Bye (23 November 1937 – 24 September 2018) was a Norwegian politician for the Labour Party. He was Minister of Transport and Communications from 1979–1981.

References

1937 births
2018 deaths
Ministers of Transport and Communications of Norway
Labour Party (Norway) politicians
Politicians from Oslo